The Men's Club Throw F32/51 had its Final held on September 15 at 17:05.

Medalists

Results

References
Final

Athletics at the 2008 Summer Paralympics
2008